The InBetween is an American supernatural drama television series created by Moira Kirland that premiered on NBC on May 29 and aired through August 14, 2019.

In November 2019, the series was canceled after one season.

Premise
Cassie Bedford has the ability to see and communicate with ghosts, which can be unpleasant to experience. However, sometimes she is able to help them, and sometimes she is willing. Her foster father, Detective Tom Hackett, knows about her abilities, and his skeptical new partner, a former FBI agent named Damien Asante, becomes a believer when her visions start to help them solve cases.

Cast and characters

Main

 Harriet Dyer as Cassie Bedford, a bartender with unexplained psychic abilities, including being able to converse with spirits and witnessing moments that have occurred in the past. She copes with her "gift" by using it to aid the police, in part to avoid winding up like her mother, who rejected her gift and abandoned Cassie before succumbing to alcoholism.
 Justin Cornwell as Det. Damien Asante, a former FBI profiler and LAPD detective who transfers to Seattle in search of new opportunities. It is later revealed that he actually transferred to watch over his fiancée Sally, who is presently in a coma. 
 Cindy Luna as Det. Maria Salinas, a member of Tom's unit
 Anne-Marie Johnson as Lt. Swanstrom, Tom and Damien's superior.
 Chad James Buchanan as Will, Cassie's coworker and occasional romantic partner. He is currently training to be a chef.
 Paul Blackthorne as Det. Tom Hackett, an English-born officer with the Seattle PD. He and his husband Brian raised Cassie, although Brian is bothered that Tom chooses to exploit Cassie's powers as a police resource.

Recurring

 Michael B. Silver as Brian Currie, Tom's husband and a professional therapist
 Andres Joseph as Det. Zayn Meier, an investigator specializing in digital tracking and forensics
 Sean Bolger as Ed Roven, a serial killer active in Texas during the 1990s, who was caught and later executed in 2005. He appears as a spirit to Cassie, seeking help leaving the "InBetween".
 Grace Lynn Kung as Amy Shu, medical examiner

Episodes

Production

Development
On January 12, 2018, it was announced that NBC had given the production a pilot order. The pilot was written by Moira Kirland, who executive produces alongside David Heyman and Nancy Cotton. Production companies involved with the pilot include Heyday Television and Universal Television. On May 10, 2018, it was announced that the production had been given a series order. A few days later, it was announced that the series would premiere as a mid-season replacement in the spring of 2019. On April 1, 2019, it was announced that the series would be held back from mid-season with a premiere date of May 29, 2019.

On November 1, 2019, NBC canceled the series after a single season.

Casting
In March 2018, it was announced that Yusuf Gatewood, Cindy Luna, and Anne-Marie Johnson had been cast in the pilot's lead roles. Alongside the series order announcement, it was reported that Chad James Buchanan and Paul Blackthorne had joined the cast and that Gatewood's part would be recast. On September 25, 2018, it was announced that Justin Cornwell had been cast to replace Gatewood.

Reception

Critical response
The review aggregation website Rotten Tomatoes reported a 67% approval rating for the series, based on 9 reviews, with an average rating of 5.42/10.

Ratings

References

External links 
 
 

2010s American LGBT-related drama television series
2010s American drama television series
2019 American television series debuts
2019 American television series endings
English-language television shows
Fictional portrayals of the Seattle Police Department
NBC original programming
Television series by Universal Television
Television series about ghosts
2010s American supernatural television series
Television shows about psychic powers
Television shows set in Seattle